Stokes Bay is a community (Canadian Post code N0H 0A9), in the Municipality of Northern Bruce Peninsula on Bruce Peninsula (which partly encloses Georgian Bay), and the eastern shore of Lake Huron, in Ontario.

References

Populated places on Lake Huron in Canada
Communities in Bruce County